The 1995 Southwest Conference women's basketball tournament was held March 8–11, 1995, at Moody Coliseum in Dallas, Texas. 

Number 1 seed  defeated 2 seed  84-62 to win their 3rd championship and receive the conference's automatic bid to the 1995 NCAA tournament.

Format and seeding 
The tournament consisted of an 8 team single-elimination tournament.

Tournament

References 

Southwest Conference women's Basketball Tournament
1995 in sports in Texas
Basketball in Dallas
1995 in American women's basketball